Jackson Diego Ibraim Fagundes (born 31 October 1995), known as Dieguinho or just Diego, is a Brazilian footballer who plays for Goiás. A versatile player, he primarily plays as either a right back or a defensive midfielder, but can also play as an attacking midfielder or a forward.

Club career
Born in Macaé, Rio de Janeiro, Diego began his senior career with Barcelona-RJ in 2017. He joined Resende for the 2018 season, but after featuring rarely, he was loaned to Friburguense in April of that year.

Back to Resende, Diego again featured sparingly and moved on loan to Série D side Portuguesa-RJ on 13 April 2019. In July, he returned to Friburguense, also in a temporary deal.

On 13 July 2020, after playing in the 2020 Campeonato Carioca for Resende, Diego signed a permanent contract with Boa Esporte. On 12 May of the following year, he agreed to a deal with Goiás in the Série B.

On 2 December 2021, after achieving promotion to the Série A as a starter, Diego renewed his contract until the end of 2023.

Career statistics

Honours
Friburguense
Campeonato Carioca Série B1: 2019

References

1995 births
Living people
People from Macaé
Brazilian footballers
Association football defenders
Association football midfielders
Association football utility players
Campeonato Brasileiro Série B players
Campeonato Brasileiro Série C players
Campeonato Brasileiro Série D players
Resende Futebol Clube players
Friburguense Atlético Clube players
Associação Atlética Portuguesa (RJ) players
Boa Esporte Clube players
Goiás Esporte Clube players
Sportspeople from Rio de Janeiro (state)